The Division of Wide Bay is an Australian electoral division in the state of Queensland.

Geography
Since 1984, federal electoral division boundaries in Australia have been determined at redistributions by a redistribution committee appointed by the Australian Electoral Commission. Redistributions occur for the boundaries of divisions in a particular state, and they occur every seven years, or sooner if a state's representation entitlement changes or when divisions of a state are malapportioned.

History

The division was proclaimed in 1900, and was one of the original 65 divisions to be contested at the first federal election. Wide Bay is located in south east Queensland and includes the cities of Maryborough, Gympie, Noosa, all of Fraser Island, and inland areas extending west to Murgon.

Notable representatives have included three time Prime Minister Andrew Fisher, who was the seat's first member. However, it has been a conservative seat for most of its history; only one other Labor member has ever won it. Warren Truss, former leader of the National Party and Deputy Prime Minister of Australia, held the seat from 1990 to 2016.

Members

Election results

References

External links
 Division of Wide Bay (Qld) — Australian Electoral Commission

Electoral divisions of Australia
Constituencies established in 1901
1901 establishments in Australia
Federal politics in Queensland
Sunshine Coast, Queensland